The 2016 German motorcycle Grand Prix was the ninth round of the 2016 MotoGP season. It was held at the Sachsenring in Hohenstein-Ernstthal on 17 July 2016.

Classification

MotoGP

 Stefan Bradl suffered a concussion in the Sunday morning warm-up session.

Moto2

 Danny Kent pulled out of the event after Friday practice due to broken ribs he suffered while karting earlier in the week.

Moto3

 Maria Herrera (broken left wrist), Niccolo Antonelli (broken left collarbone) and Fabio Spiranelli (broken left hand) suffered injuries during the Saturday qualifying session.

Championship standings after the race (MotoGP)
Below are the standings for the top five riders and constructors after round eight has concluded.

Riders' Championship standings

Constructors' Championship standings

 Note: Only the top five positions are included for both sets of standings.

References

German
Motorcycle Grand Prix
German motorcycle Grand Prix
German